The Crimson Key Society is an organization at Harvard University devoted to serving the University. Founded on April 14, 1948, CKS was originally formed to welcome visiting athletic teams to Harvard and represented Harvard's first organized commitment to hospitality. Crimson Key later went on to provide campus tours to prospective students and visitors, welcome incoming students during Freshman Week, and toured the country to recruit applicants. CKS has played a major role in expanding Harvard's global image, helping to gain world renown for the university as both an academic institution and as a brand. Benazir Bhutto, Radcliffe Class of 1973, was perhaps the best-known member of the Society. Today, CKS continues to provide tours to visitors to the university and welcomes new freshmen with a week of activities, including most famously a Rocky Horror Picture Show-style screening of Love Story that has attracted both praise and criticism from the media.

References

External links
http://www.crimsonkeysociety.org/about/history
http://www.thecrimson.com/article/1989/6/8/behind-pinkie-bhuttos-passion-for-politics/
http://www.nytimes.com/2010/08/22/movies/22love.html

Harvard University